NorthLink Ferries (also referred to as Serco NorthLink Ferries) is an operator of passenger and vehicle ferries, as well as ferry services, between mainland Scotland and the Northern Isles of Orkney and Shetland. Since July 2012, it has been operated by international services company Serco.

History

NorthLink Orkney and Shetland Ferries 
The subsidised Northern Isles ferry services, previously run by P&O Scottish Ferries, were put out to tender in 1999. A joint venture between Caledonian MacBrayne and The Royal Bank of Scotland, named NorthLink Orkney and Shetland Ferries, won the contract and began operation in October 2002.

A variety of factors, including competition from rival operator Pentland Ferries, the Norse Island Ferries group created by local hauliers concerned about NorthLink's proposed freight pricing, and higher-than-expected operation costs, contributed to financial difficulties within the company. In response, the Scottish Executive Transport Group (now Transport Scotland) made additional subsidy payments of £0.6 million and agreed to restructure subsidy payment timing.

In mid-2003 the company indicated that it would be unlikely to complete its contract due to the ongoing financial difficulties. NorthLink defaulted on its lease payments for the vessels in July and August 2003, and in April 2004 the then Scottish Executive announced that the service would be re-tendered due to NorthLink's inability to fulfil the terms of its contract.

The company continued to operate under interim arrangements until April 2006 while a new contract was secured.

NorthLink Ferries Limited 
On 19 July 2005, the Scottish Executive announced that three companies - V-Ships, Irish Continental Ferries and Caledonian MacBrayne -  had bid to provide ferry services to the Northern Isles. Irish Continental, however, withdrew its bid in October 2005, leaving two potential operators on the closing date of 1 December 2005. Both of the remaining bids complied with the contract requirements, but Caledonian MacBrayne's lower bid meant that it was awarded the contract.

Caledonian MacBrayne formed a company named NorthLink Ferries Limited, which adopted the branding and vessels of its predecessor, and began operating the Northern Isles ferry services on 6 July 2006.

Serco NorthLink Ferries 
The Northern Isles ferry service was re-tendered in 2011/12 as NorthLink Ferries Limited's contract came to an end. 

Initially, the contract's two services (Aberdeen-Lerwick and Scrabster-Stromness) were to be de-bundled. Eligible bids for the services were received from Pentland Ferries (which expressed interest in the Scrabster-Stromness service only), Sea-Cargo A/S (which expressed interest in the Aberdeen-Lerwick service only), P&O Ferries, Shetland Line (1984) Limited (part of local haulage and freight company Streamline Shipping Group), Serco, and the incumbent NorthLink Ferries Limited.  The Scottish Government subsequently re-bundled the routes, when insufficient interest was shown in the separate routes.

On 4 May 2012, Transport Scotland announced that Serco was the preferred bidder. This decision was legally challenged in the Court of Session by rival bidder Shetland Line (1984) Limited on the basis that the Scottish Government had allegedly not taken into account that they had scored higher than Serco for their proposed service - suspending the securement of the contract. On 29 May 2012 however, the court overturned the suspension and Serco was confirmed as the new operator, ending Caledonian MacBrayne's 10 year involvement with Northern Isles ferry services. The contract lasts for a period of six years and is worth £243m.

Serco, using the vessels and branding of its predecessor, began operation of Northern Isles ferry services at 15:00 on 5 July 2012. It stated that it planned to make no changes to fares or timetables for the remainder of 2012, and that it planned to "overhaul catering, seating and onboard entertainment" in future.

In Spring 2013 NorthLink rebranded and launched new on board services such as "sleep pod" reclining seats and a premium lounge. The contract was due to end in 2018, but Serco received an 18-month extension. Arguments have been put forward by the RMT union to bring the service into public ownership. In February 2020, Paul Wheelhouse, the Scottish Minister for Energy, Connectivity and the Islands, announced that NorthLink's contract would be re-awarded by the end of March.

Services

NorthLink operates two passenger routes:
Scrabster to Stromness, Orkney (90 minutes)
Aberdeen to Lerwick, Shetland (12 hours 30 minutes northbound; 12 hours southbound). Some services also call at Kirkwall, Orkney, which increases the journey time by 2 hours.

Fleet
Currently the NorthLink fleet consists of:
, on the Pentland Firth route, 112 m long
These boats are due to be replaced.

Scottish Government agency Transport Scotland purchased all of the ferries used by Northlink during the 2018-19 financial year. They will be managed by Scottish Government corporation Caledonian Maritime Assets.

Former fleet consists of:

Ferries on the Aberdeen route have onboard cinemas and occasional live entertainment.

References

Notes

Bibliography

External links 

 

 
Ferry companies of Scotland
Northern Isles
Companies based in Orkney
2006 establishments in Scotland
Serco
Transport companies established in 2006
Organisations associated with Shetland